Karenza may refer to:
Skol Veythrin Karenza, a Cornish-speaking school in Cornwall 
'Karenza', a daffodil cultivar named by Arthur Boscawen

People with the given name
Karenza Mathews (born 1950), English table tennis player

See also
Carenza (disambiguation)	 
Charenza
Polwhele House School, whose Polwhele family has the motto Karenza wheelas Karenza (Cornish for "Love seeks out love")